The tongue-in-cheek epithet Mayor for Life has been popularly applied to several long-serving mayors of American cities including:

Jerry Abramson of Louisville, who was elected five times and served from 1986 to 1999 and from 2003 to 2011
Marion Barry of Washington, D.C. (elected four times, served from 1979 to 1991 and 1995 to 1999)
Tom Bradley (American politician) of Los Angeles (elected five times, served from 1973 to 1993)
Buddy Cianci of Providence, Rhode Island, who served from 1975 and 1984 and from 1991 to 2002, leaving office twice due a felony conviction in 1984 and a corruption scandal in 2002
Richard J. Daley of Chicago (elected six times, served from 1955 to his death in 1976)
Richard M. Daley of Chicago (son of the above, also elected six times, served from 1989 to 2011)
Thomas Menino of Boston, who was elected five times and served from 1993 to 2014
Stephen R. Reed of Harrisburg (elected seven times, served from 1982 to 2010)